Walter R. Livingston Jr. (May 25, 1922 - June 8, 2011) was an American architect, activist and city planner.

Biography

Early life and education
Walter R. Livingston, Jr., was born, reared and educated in the city of Philadelphia.  He was the son of the late Eloise Nelson Livingston, a school teacher from Greensboro, NC and Walter R Livingston, Sr., a lawyer and mechanical engineer from Marianna, FL.  He had one sister, Grace Livingston Goss.

Mr. Livingston, a member of the 172 class of Central High School (Philadelphia) graduated in 1939.  After graduating he attended Cheyney University and received a Bachelor of Science degree in education in 1943.  Livingston then joined the US Army and served two years in World War II as a Technical Sergeant.  He received two bronze stars for bravery in the Battle of the Bulge.  On being honorably discharged he attended the University of Pennsylvania and received a Bachelor of Architecture degree in 1949 and a Master of City Planning degree in 1955.

Family
In 1951 Livingston married Marjorie V. Cachie of New York.  Their love endured for 60 years and together, they had six children, three boys and three girls followed by twelve grandchildren and are also survived by eight great grands and three great-great grandchildren.

Career
In 1960 Mr. Livingston opened his first architecture firm in partnership and continued practicing for nearly fifty years as the senior partner with several firms.  During that time he was responsible for the design of more than three quarters of a billion dollars of construction projects including residential, commercial, institutional and industrial type buildings.  His work included both public and private clients.  In 1976 his peers honored him when he was invested into the Fellow of the American Institute of Architects for his outstanding contribution to the field of Architecture, the first and only black Philadelphian to receive this honor.  Notable buildings designed by his firms, include the Justice Juanita Kidd Stout Center for Criminal Justice, Zion Baptist Church, the Triumph Baptist Church, the Edison/Fareira High School, the Martin Luther King Recreation Center, the West Branch YMCA, the Clef Club of Jazz and Performing Arts, the Ada B. George Dining Hall at Cheyney University, a number of mini-rise apartment buildings, and many other buildings.  He was licensed to practice architecture in the states of Pennsylvania, New York, New Jersey, Delaware and Indiana, and certified by the National Council of Architectural Registration Boards.

Awards and boards
In addition to his professional activities, highlights of Mr. Livingston's extensive service to civic and community activities are numerous.  He was a Past President of the Philadelphia Urban League, who in 1994 awarded him the Whitney Young Heritage Award for his contribution to the community.  The Boy Scouts of America awarded him with the Silver Beaver and the Silver Antelope Awards for his dedication and service to youth.  In recognition of extraordinary contributions in public service he was awarded the Jefferson Award by the Evening and Sunday Bulletin in 1978.  In 1980 he was awarded the Leslie Pinckney Hill Centennial Recognition Citation by Cheyney University for his contributions in the field of Architecture and City Planning.  Livingston has served on the boards of Wesley Enhanced Living at Stapeley in Germantown, Southeastern Pennsylvania Chapter of the American Red Cross, Northeast Regional Board and the executive committee of the Cradle of Liberty Council of the Boy Scouts of America, The Presbyterian Foundation for Philadelphia, Berean Institute, Harcum College, and the Philadelphia Housing and Development Corporation.  Additionally Mr. Livingston has served as chairman of the boards of The Philadelphia Tribune Newspaper and the Center Post Housing Development. In 2011, Livingston, who served on the board of NewCourtland, was honored – his family was presented with the Ephraim D. Saunders award for exceptional acts of community service – at the opening of a $14.6 million facility.

He also has served on the boards of the Philadelphia Redevelopment Authority, Philadelphia Industrial Development Corporation, Philadelphia Chamber of Commerce, Youth Study Center of Philadelphia, The Philadelphia Foundation, Southern Home Services, Penn Presbyterian Medical Center, the Berean Federal Savings Bank and Charter Vice-president of The University City Swim Club.

Mr. Livingston was a 33-degree mason, a member of the Holy Apostles and the Mediator Church, the Alpha Phi Alpha fraternity, the Union League of Philadelphia, and the Philadelphia Chapter of Rotary International.

References

20th-century American architects
African-American architects
American urban planners
University of Pennsylvania School of Design alumni
1922 births
2011 deaths
Architects from Philadelphia
Cheyney University of Pennsylvania alumni
Central High School (Philadelphia) alumni
United States Army personnel of World War II
Alpha Phi Alpha members
Fellows of the American Institute of Architects
20th-century African-American people
21st-century African-American people
21st-century American architects